Wild Love may refer to:

Film
Wild Love (film), a 1955 Italian film

Music

Albums
Wild Love (album), a 1995 album by Smog

Songs
"Wild Love" (Cashmere Cat song), a 2016 song by Norwegian DJ and record producer Cashmere Cat
"Wild Love" (Faul & Wad Ad song), 2018
"Wild Love" (James Bay song), 2018
"Wild Love", by Bonnie Tyler from Goodbye to the Island
"Wild Love", by Chris Isaak from Chris Isaak
"Wild Love", by Krokus from Heart Attack
"Wild Love", by Cashmere Cat
"Wild Love", by Elle King
"Wild Love", by Mungo Jerry
"Wild Love", by Rea Garvey

See also
Wild Is Love, a 1960 album by American singer and pianist Nat King Cole
"Wild Wild Love", a song by American rapper Pitbull from the 2014 album Globalization